Irina Lazarevna S(ch)herbakova (in Russian : Ирина Лазаревна Щербакова) (born 1949) is a Russian historian of the modern age, an author and a founding member of Memorial. She was awarded the Carl von Ossietsky Prize for Contemporary History and Politics in 2014, and the Goethe Medal in 2017. She has been studying Russia's modern history since the 1970s. Memorial was identified as one of Russia's "foreign agents" in 2016. In 2022, Memorial has been co-awarded the Nobel Peace Prize.

Life 
Shcherbakova was born in Moscow in 1949. Her parents were Jewish communists. When she went to university, she studied German and earned her doctorate in 1972. She then became a translator working on fiction.

In the 1970s she began to record interviews with witnesses to Stalinism. She interviewed Gulag survivors who were afraid and would not talk if their recollections were recorded on a tape recorder.

In 1988 Shcherbakova was one of the founding members of the organisation called Memorial. She requested that the authorities resolve the cases of the crimes committed whilst Stalinism was in charge in Russia.

In 2014 she was chosen to be given the German Ossietzky Award, which includes a prize of 10,000 euros. The judges chose her because of her campaign to study Russia's recent troubled history, and for encouraging German–Russian relations.

In 2016 the Memorial organisation was labeled a "foreign agent" by the Russian Ministry of Justice. In 2017, Shcherbakova was awarded the Goethe Medal.''

Shcherbakova's work has been translated and republished by The Guardian. In 2019 she accused the Russian establishment of trying to rehabilitate Joseph Stalin as a national hero while forgetting his human rights abuses, which claimed millions of lives.

In 2022, Memorial, Russia's most respected rights group, was co-awarded the Nobel Peace Prize less than a year after it was ordered to shut down during a wave of repression against critical voices.

References 

1949 births
Living people
Writers from Moscow
20th-century Russian historians
21st-century Russian historians